The International Center for Transitional Justice (ICTJ) was founded in 2001 as a non-profit organization dedicated to pursuing accountability for mass atrocity and human rights abuse through transitional justice mechanisms.

ICTJ officially opened its doors in New York City on March 1, 2001, and within six months was operating in more than a dozen countries, as requests for assistance poured in.

A collection of materials assembled by the ICTJ covering the years 1981–2008 is housed at the Duke University library.

Notable staff
Alex Boraine, Co-Founder and First President of ICTJ
Priscilla Hayner, Co-Founder of ICTJ and former director of its Sierra Leone, Peru, and Ghana Programs 
Paul van Zyl, Co-Founder of ICTJ and CEO of PeaceVentures
Juan E. Mendez, President Emeritus of ICTJ
Fernando Travesí, Executive Director of ICTJ
Pablo de Greiff, Director of Research (and from 2012 to 2018 a United Nations special rapporteur)

References

External links
 ICTJ Homepage
 https://www.ohchr.org/en/issues/truthjusticereparation/pages/index.aspx

International law organizations
Human rights organizations based in the United States
Transitional justice